This list of people in Playboy 1980–1989 is a catalog of women and men who appeared in Playboy magazine in the years 1980 through 1989. Not all of the people featured in the magazine are pictured in the nude.

Entries in blue indicate that the issue marks the original appearance of that year's Playmate of the Year (PMOY).

1980

1981

1982

1983

1984

1985

1986

1987

1988

1989

See also
 List of people in Playboy 1953–1959
 List of people in Playboy 1960–1969
 List of people in Playboy 1970–1979
 List of people in Playboy 1990–1999
 List of people in Playboy 2000–2009
 List of people in Playboy 2010–2020

References

Playboy 1980-1989
Playboy 1980-1989
Playboy lists
Playboy 1980-1989
Playboy